The National Chess Federation of the Philippines (NCFP) is a non-profit organization, the governing chess organization within the Philippines, and one of the member federations of the Fédération Internationale des Échecs.

The Philippines has produced ten chess Grandmasters (GM), including GMs Eugene Torre, Rogelio Antonio, Wesley So, Darwin Laylo, Jayson Gonzales, Bong Villamayor, Joseph Sanchez, Mark Paragua, and Nelson Mariano II (inactive). IM Ronald Dableo is GM in waiting after achieving three GM Norms and needs to raise his Elo rating to 2,500 points to get the full GM status. Wesley So now represents the United States of America after his successful transfer to the United States Chess Federation in November 2014.

Rosendo Carreon Balinas Jr.
(September 10, 1941 – September 24, 1998) was a chess grandmaster from the Philippines. FIDE awarded him the International Master title in 1975 and the International Grandmaster title in 1976. He was Philippines' second chess grandmaster.

Plus GM Julio Sadorra and GM John Paul Gomez.

See also
Shell National Youth Active Chess Championship
Department of Education (Philippines)
Philippine Olympic Committee
Philippine Sports Commission

References

External links

Philippines
Philippines
Chess in the Philippines
Chess